Bayshore station may refer to:

 Bayshore station (Ottawa), a bus terminal in Ottawa, Ontario, Canada
 Bayshore station (Caltrain), a railway station in San Francisco, California, United States
 Bayshore MRT station, a MRT station in Singapore
 Bay Shore station, a railway station in Bay Shore, New York, United States